Frederick Eustace Barker,  (December 27, 1838 – December 15, 1915) was a Canadian lawyer, judge and politician. He was in office for 2 years.

Biography
Born in Sheffield, New Brunswick, the son of Enoch Barker, Barker was educated at the Sunbury Grammar School and received a Bachelor of Arts degree in 1856, a Master of Arts degree in 1858, and a Bachelor of Civil Law degree in 1866 from King's College Law School (now the University of New Brunswick Faculty of Law). In 1861, he was called to the Bar and was created a Queen's Counsel in 1873. He practiced law in Saint John, New Brunswick, and was appointed a commissioner for consolidating the Statutes of New Brunswick in 1875. He was president of the St. John Bridge and Railway Extension Company and a director of the St. John Gas Company.

He also served in the Canadian Militia with the Saint-John Light Infantry and was gazetted an ensign and soon after a lieutenant in 1864. He was promoted to captain in 1865 and major in 1868.

He was elected to the House of Commons of Canada for the electoral district of City of St. John in the 1885 by-election called after Sir Leonard Tilley was appointed Lieutenant-Governor of New Brunswick. A Conservative, he was defeated by John Valentine Ellis in the 1887 election.

A member of the Church of England, he married Elizabeth Julia Lloyd in 1865. They had one son and two daughter before she died in 1874. He later married Mary Ann Black, the niece and adopted daughter of former Lieutenant-Governor of New Brunswick Robert Duncan Wilmot. They had two daughters.

Barker served as Chief Justice of New Brunswick from 1908 to 1913.

He died in Saint John on December 15, 1915.

References

 
 

1838 births
1915 deaths
Canadian Anglicans
Conservative Party of Canada (1867–1942) MPs
Members of the House of Commons of Canada from New Brunswick
Lawyers in New Brunswick
Canadian King's Counsel
Judges in New Brunswick
University of New Brunswick alumni
University of New Brunswick Faculty of Law alumni